Chantelle can refer to:

 Chantelle (lingerie), a French women's underwear trademark.
 Chantelle (band), a Puerto Rican merengue musical group.
 Chantelle (animal), the name given for a female partridge (also called a 'hen').

Places
 Chantelle, Allier, a commune of the Allier département in France.
 Chantelle, Pretoria,  a suburb of Pretoria to the north west of the Pretoria CBD
 Deneuille-lès-Chantelle, commune in the Allier department in central France
 Canton of Chantelle, an administrative division in central France

People
 Chantelle Anderson (1981) American basketball player
 Chantelle Barry, Australian singer and actress
 Chantelle Eberle (1981) Canadian curler
 Chantelle Fiddy, British journalist
 Chantelle Handy (1987) basketball player for Great Britain women's national basketball team
 Chantelle Houghton, the non-celebrity winner of Celebrity Big Brother 4 in 2006
 Chantelle Kerry (1996) Australian figure skater
 Chantelle Newbery (1977) Australian diver, and olympic champion
 Chantelle Paige (1988) American singer-songwriter and actress

See also
 Chantal (disambiguation)